William Yate (3 November 1802 – 26 July 1877) was one of the earliest New Zealand missionaries and writers who worked for the Church Mission Society. He was born in Bridgnorth, Shropshire, England in 1802. He joined the Church Missionary Society (CMS) and entered the Church Missionary Society College, Islington, London, in 1825. He was ordained as a deacon of the Church of England on 18 December 1825, and priest on 21 May 1826. Yate learned the Māori language and had Christian texts printed in Sydney for his work.

The Revd.

The Revd. Yate took a small printing press with him to the Bay of Islands and used it to produce a version of the third catechism in Māori, Ko te katihama III. With only a fortnight's training as a printer in Sydney, New South-Wales, however, he found the task exasperatingly difficult and attempted nothing further on his press.

In 1830 during Yate's stay in Sydney, he supervised the printing of an edition of 550 copies of a translations of the first three chapters of the Book of Genesis; the first eight chapters of the Gospel according to St. Matthew; the first four chapters of the Gospel according to St. John; the first six chapters of the Epistle of St. Paul to the Corinthians; parts of the Liturgy and Catechism.

In 1830 he was appointed to lead Te Waimate mission, however reports of his sexual encounters with young Māori men became a matter of controversy and he was dismissed from the CMS in June 1834.

Publications

References

1802 births
1877 deaths
19th-century LGBT people
English Anglican missionaries
English emigrants to New Zealand
Anglican missionaries in New Zealand
Gay men
LGBT Christian clergy
New Zealand writers
People from Bridgnorth